Amalophyllon is a genus of flowering plants belonging to the family Gesneriaceae.

Its native range is Mexico.

Species:

Amalophyllon albiflorum 
Amalophyllon caripense 
Amalophyllon clarkii 
Amalophyllon divaricatum 
Amalophyllon ecuadoranum 
Amalophyllon laceratum 
Amalophyllon macrophylloides 
Amalophyllon macrophyllum 
Amalophyllon parviflorum 
Amalophyllon repens 
Amalophyllon roezlii 
Amalophyllon rubidum 
Amalophyllon rupestre

References

Gesnerioideae
Gesneriaceae genera